Alcedo is a genus of birds in the kingfisher subfamily Alcedininae. Alcedo may also refer to:

Populated places 
 Alcedo, Álava, a village in Lantarón municipality, Spain
 Alcedo, Asturias, town in Las Regueras municipality, Spain
 Alcedo de Alba, a town in La Robla municipality, Spain

Other 
 Alcedo Volcano, a volcano on Isabela Island in the Galapagos
 José Bernardo Alcedo, Peruvian composer